The Master Musicians of Jajouka led by Bachir Attar (sometimes written as ...featuring Bachir Attar) are a collective of Jbala Sufi trance musicians, serving as a modern representation of a centuries-old music tradition. The collective includes musicians from the village of Jajouka (sometimes spelled as Joujouka or Zahjouka), in the Rif Mountains of northern Morocco. Most members are the sons of previous members, and adopt the surname Attar ("perfume maker").

History 

The original Master Musicians of Joujouka were first documented by Western journalists in the early 1950s. In the early 1990s, the collective split into two factions, as first reported by visiting musician Lee Ranaldo. One collective retained the name "The Master Musicians of Joujouka". Meanwhile, the faction led by Bachir Attar, whose father had led the group in the late 1960s, took on the name "The Master Musicians of Jajouka led by Bachir Attar". Bachir Attar's group attracted protests at concerts in the United Kingdom, and international journalists noted that the schism created discord in the collective's home village. Other journalists and fans conceded that both groups were working to preserve their ancient musical heritage.

Bachir Attar's group released the album Apocalypse Across the Sky in 1992, produced by Bill Laswell. Jajouka Between the Mountains followed in 1996, produced by Tchad Blake; and Master Musicians of Jajouka Featuring Bachir Attar, produced by Talvin Singh, was released in 2000. Their most recent album, The Road to Jajouka, was released in 2014 and featured guest appearances by Ornette Coleman, John Medeski, Flea, DJ Logic, Lee Ranaldo, Bill Laswell, and many others.

Members
Current

Bachir Attar
Mustapha Attar
Mohamed "Hadj" Attar
Amin Attar
Mohamed Attar The Mohkadem
Mohamed Attar Berdouz Jr.
Hamido Attar
Abdellah Bohkzar
Mokhtar Jaghdal
Abdelzarak "Hadj" Attar
Bouker Talha
Ahmed el Ballouti
Ahmed Bahkat

Former

Larbi Hlalli Attar
Abdellah Bokzar
Tahir Bokzar
Abdeslam Bokzar
Mohamed El Hatmi (currently with Master Musicians of Joujouka)
Ali Maidoubi
Ali Nachat

Discography  
 Apocalypse Across the Sky (1992)
 Jajouka Between the Mountains (1996)
 Master Musicians of Jajouka Featuring Bachir Attar (2000)
 Jajouka Live Vol. 1 (2009)
 The Road to Jajouka (2014)
Dancing Under the moon (2022)

Film soundtracks and compilation albums 

 Ornette: Made in America (1985, film sound track appearance)
 The Sheltering Sky (1990, film soundtrack and film appearance)
 Naked Lunch (1991, film soundtrack appearance)
 Lost in the Translation: Axiom Ambient (1994)
 The Cell (2000, film soundtrack appearance with The London Philharmonic Orchestra)
 Time's Up Live (2001)
 Along Came Polly (2004, film soundtrack appearance)
 Jajouka Something Good Comes To You - Master Musicians Of Jajouka Led By Bachir Attar (2021, La Huit)

References

External links
The Rolling Stones in Morocco, a segment of the BBC television film with Mick Jagger and Bachir Attar in Jajouka and Tangier, The Master Musicians of Jajouka. (YouTube.com)
Interview with Bachir Attar in The Walrus, Toronto (9 July 2008)
Lion-Auriga Music Publishing Master Musicians of Jajouka featuring Bachir Attar artist page

Jajouka
Moroccan musical groups
Performers of Sufi music
Trance music groups